Stefan Edberg was the defending champion but lost in the first round to Boris Becker.

Petr Korda won in the final 7–6(7–5), 2–6, 7–6(7–5) against Younes El Aynaoui.

Seeds

  Thomas Muster (semifinals)
  Boris Becker (second round)
  Thomas Enqvist (second round)
  Michael Stich (second round)
  Magnus Larsson (quarterfinals)
  Paul Haarhuis (first round)
  Gilbert Schaller (first round)
  Jan Siemerink (first round)

Draw

Finals

Top half

Bottom half

External links
 1996 Qatar Open Singles Draw

1996 Qatar Open
1996 ATP Tour
Qatar Open (tennis)